The Jud Christie Covered Bridge No. 95 (also known as the Jud Christian Covered Bridge) is a historic wooden covered bridge located at Jackson Township and Pine Township in Columbia County, Pennsylvania. It crosses the Little Fishing Creek. It is one of 28 historic covered bridges in Columbia and Montour Counties.

It was listed on the National Register of Historic Places in 1979.

References 

Covered bridges on the National Register of Historic Places in Pennsylvania
Covered bridges in Columbia County, Pennsylvania
Bridges completed in 1876
Wooden bridges in Pennsylvania
Bridges in Columbia County, Pennsylvania
National Register of Historic Places in Columbia County, Pennsylvania
Road bridges on the National Register of Historic Places in Pennsylvania
Queen post truss bridges in the United States